The Romania national women's cricket team is the team that represents Romania in international women's cricket. In April 2018, the International Cricket Council (ICC) granted full Women's Twenty20 International (WT20I) status to all its members. Therefore, all Twenty20 matches that will be played between Romania women and other ICC members after 1 July 2018 have been eligible for full WT20I status.

Records and statistics 
International Match Summary — Romania Women
 
Last updated 11 September 2022

Twenty20 International 
T20I record versus other nations

Records complete to WT20I #1211. Last updated 11 September 2022.

See also
 List of Romania women Twenty20 International cricketers

References

Cricket
Women's national cricket teams
Cricket in Romania